An extreme trans-Neptunian object (ETNO) is a trans-Neptunian object orbiting the Sun well beyond Neptune (30 AU) in the outermost region of the Solar System. An ETNO has a large semi-major axis of at least 150–250 AU. Its orbit is much less affected by the known giant planets than all other known trans-Neptunian objects. They may, however, be influenced by gravitational interactions with a hypothetical Planet Nine, shepherding these objects into similar types of orbits. The known ETNOs exhibit a highly statistically significant asymmetry between the distributions of object pairs with small ascending and descending nodal distances that might be indicative of a response to external perturbations.

ETNOs can be divided into three different subgroups. The scattered ETNOs (or extreme scattered disc objects, ESDOs) have perihelia around 38–45 AU and an exceptionally high eccentricity of more than 0.85. As with the regular scattered disc objects, they were likely formed as result of gravitational scattering by Neptune and still interact with the giant planets. The detached ETNOs (or extreme detached disc objects, EDDOs), with perihelia approximately between 40–45 and 50–60 AU, are less affected by Neptune than the scattered ETNOs, but are still relatively close to Neptune. The sednoid or inner Oort cloud objects, with perihelia beyond 50–60 AU, are too far from Neptune to be strongly influenced by it.

Sednoids 

Among the extreme trans-Neptunian objects are the sednoids, three objects with an outstandingly high perihelion: Sedna, and Leleākūhonua. Their high perihelia keep them at a sufficient distance to avoid significant gravitational perturbations from Neptune. Previous explanations for the high perihelion of Sedna include a close encounter with an unknown planet on a distant orbit and a distant encounter with a random star or a member of the Sun's birth cluster that passed near the Solar System.

Most distant objects from the Sun

Trujillo and Sheppard discoveries 
Extreme trans-Neptunian objects discovered by astronomers Chad Trujillo and Scott S. Sheppard include:
 ,  Longitude of perihelion aligned with Planet Nine, but well within the proposed orbit of Planet Nine, where computer modeling suggests it would be safe from gravitational kicks.
 , appears to be anti-aligned with Planet Nine.
 , an object with an orbit so extreme that it reaches about 3,000 AU from the Sun in a massively-elongated ellipse – at this distance its orbit is influenced by the galactic tide and other stars.

Outer Solar System Origins Survey 
The Outer Solar System Origins Survey has discovered more extreme trans-Neptunian objects, including:
 , which has a lower inclination than many of the objects, and which was discussed by Michele Bannister at a March 2016 lecture hosted by the SETI Institute and later at an October 2016 AAS conference.
 , which has an orientation similar to  but has a larger semi-major axis that may result in its orbit crossing Planet Nine's.
 , which fits with the other anti-aligned objects.
 , which is in neither the anti-aligned nor the aligned groups; instead, its orbit's orientation is at a right angle to that of the proposed Planet Nine. Its argument of perihelion is also outside the cluster of arguments of perihelion.

Since early 2016, ten more extreme trans-Neptunian objects have been discovered with orbits that have a perihelion greater than 30 AU and a semi-major axis greater than 250 AU bringing the total to sixteen (see table below for a complete list). Most TNOs have perihelia significantly beyond Neptune, which orbits  from the Sun. Generally, TNOs with perihelia smaller than  experience strong encounters with Neptune. Most of the ETNOs are relatively small, but currently relatively bright because they are near their closest distance to the Sun in their elliptical orbits. These are also included in the orbital diagrams and tables below.

TESS data search 
Malena Rice and Gregory Laughlin applied a targeted shift-stacking search algorithm to analyze data from TESS sectors 18 and 19 looking for candidate outer solar system objects. Their search recovered known ETNOs like Sedna and produced 17 new outer Solar system body candidates located at geocentric distances in the range 80–200 AU, that need follow-up observations with ground-based telescope resources for confirmation. Early results from a survey with WHT aimed at recovering these distant TNO candidates have failed to confirm two of them.

List 

  (*) longitude of perihelion, ϖ, outside expected range; 
  are the objects included in the original study by Trujillo and Sheppard (2014).
  has been added in the 2016 study by Brown and Batygin.
 All other objects have been announced later.

Notes

References

External links 
 Known extreme outer solar system objects, Scott Sheppard, Carnegie Science Center
 Hunt for Ninth Planet Reveals New Extremely Distant Solar System Objects, Scott Sheppard, Carnegie Science Center
 List of Known Trans-Neptunian Objects (including ESDOs and EDDOs), Robert Johnston, Johnston's Archive

 
Distant minor planets
Neptune